Mourioux-Vieilleville is a commune in the Creuse department in the Nouvelle-Aquitaine region in central France.

Geography
The commune is served by a TER railway.

Population

Sights
 The church, dating from the thirteenth century.
 A group of dolmen called  "le Four des Fades".
 A fifteenth-century house known as  "le Monastère".

See also
Communes of the Creuse department

References

Communes of Creuse